Apusomonas is a genus of Apusozoa erected by A. G. Aléxéieff in 1924.

It includes the species Apusomonas proboscidea.

References

Apusomonadida
Eukaryote genera